Cardigan Rugby Football Club is a rugby union team from the town of Cardigan, West Wales. The club is a member of the Welsh Rugby Union and is a feeder club for the Llanelli Scarlets.

History
Rugby came to Cardigan through the local Free Grammar School in the 1860s when games were arranged against fellow Welsh colleges Lampeter and Llandovery. The rugby club itself was founded in 1876 making the team one of the oldest in Wales, and initially they played in an Oxford Blue strip.

As with all Welsh rugby club teams, Cardigan RFC disbanded during the First World War, but the club reformed in the 1920-21 through ex-servicemen. The club disbanded again during the Second World War, but after reforming for a second time they gained membership of the Welsh Rugby Union in 1956. In 1967 a new clubhouse was built but this burned down in 1969, though rebuilt later that year. In 1992 floodlights and a 350 all-weather stand were introduced to the pitch.

References

Rugby clubs established in 1876
Welsh rugby union teams
rugby football
1876 establishments in Wales